Wicked Game (Egyptian Arabic: لعبة الأشرار translit: Loubat El Ashrar or Luebat al'ashrar or Lou’bat Al-Achrar aliases: The Game of the Wicked) is an Egyptian crime thriller released in 1991. The film stars Salah Zulfikar and is directed by Henry Barakat.

Synopsis 
Author Riyad Kamel marries the beautiful Camelia despite her previous relationship with Azmi, his lawyer. While Azmi marries Manar, who is Raiyad's secretary. Manar suspects that Azmi and Camellia are back together. She records a tape for Camelia urging Azmi to kill Manar and Riyad, so she plots to take them down.

Main cast 

 Salah Zulfikar
 Athar El-Hakim
 Samir Sabri
 Safaa El Sabaa
 Awatef Abdel Fattah
 Ziad Mukouk
 Salah Azzam
 Fadi Yazbek
 Ahmed Fouad El Alfi

References

External links
  
Wicked Game on elCinema

1991 films
1990s Arabic-language films
20th-century Egyptian films
Egyptian crime films
Films shot in Egypt
1990s crime films